William Patrick Kenney (born January 20, 1955) is an American former quarterback who spent nine years in the National Football League (NFL) with the Kansas City Chiefs from 1980 to 1988 and a former politician who spent 8 years as a Missouri State Senator. Kenney was originally drafted by the Miami Dolphins in the 12th round of the 1978 NFL Draft.

High school/college
Kenney was born in San Francisco and graduated from San Clemente High School in 1973. He originally received a scholarship to play at Arizona State University but did not play his first year. He then transferred to small Saddleback College, where he played for one season. He spent the remainder of his college career at the University of Northern Colorado.

College statistics

NFL
Kenney was drafted by the Miami Dolphins with the second to last pick of the 1978 daft. He was cut from the Dolphins at the end of training camp, but he had more success two years later, when he made the Kansas City Chiefs roster as the backup to Steve Fuller. He ended up starting games late in the year because of an injury to Fuller and did exceptionally well. His late season performance helped him to take over the starting job for good in 1981.

After an average 1982 season, Kenney was in line to be replaced by Todd Blackledge, whom the Chiefs drafted as part of the vaunted Quarterback class of 1983. Kenney responded by having a breakout season, setting team records for passing yards (4,348) and completions (346) in a season; the latter was also good enough to lead the NFL. Kenney earned a Pro Bowl berth that season. At one point, he threw for over 300 yards in 4 games in a row, topping out at 417 yards in a loss to Seattle. Unfortunately for Kenney and the Chiefs, they would lose all four games.

He did not come close to matching his 4,000-yard output over the next four seasons, but he did enough to prevent Blackledge from starting when he was healthy (in 1984, he missed 7 weeks due to a thumb injury). He eventually gave up his starting job in 1988 when the Chiefs traded for Steve DeBerg. Kenney was released after failing to throw a touchdown pass in 114 attempts that season. He left the Chiefs as the second most prolific passer in team history behind Hall of Famer Len Dawson. He has been passed in most passing categories since then by Trent Green; Green also broke Kenney's single season record for passing yards in 2004.

In 1989, he signed with the Washington Redskins to be the third quarterback behind Mark Rypien and Doug Williams. He did not appear in any games with the 'Skins, however, and he retired after the season.

Politics
Kenney took up residency in Lee's Summit, Missouri after his retirement.  He turned his attention to politics at this time, and in 1994, he successfully ran as a Republican to represent a portion of Kansas City and parts of suburban Jackson County in the Missouri State Senate.  In 1996, Kenney ran an unsuccessful campaign to become Lieutenant Governor of Missouri.

In 2001, Bill Kenney became the majority floor leader of the Missouri Senate, and held the position for two years.  He left the Senate afterwards due to term limits, and retired from politics altogether as a result.

Kenney was appointed to the Missouri Public Service Commission by Governor Jay Nixon on January 9, 2013. On January 24, 2013, he was confirmed by the Missouri Senate to a six-year term.

References

External links
Database Football - career statistics

1955 births
Living people
People from Lee's Summit, Missouri
Players of American football from San Francisco
American football quarterbacks
Arizona State Sun Devils football players
Saddleback Gauchos football players
Northern Colorado Bears football players
Kansas City Chiefs players
American Conference Pro Bowl players
Republican Party Missouri state senators
American athlete-politicians